Pete Campion is a former guard in the National Football League (NFL). He was drafted in the seventh round of the 2002 NFL Draft by the Carolina Panthers and signed contracts with the Saint Louis Rams, Green Bay Packers, Seattle Seahawks, and Oakland Raiders. He was a part of the Frankfurt Galaxy of NFL Europe.

References

External links

1979 births
Living people
American football offensive guards
North Dakota State Bison football players
Carolina Panthers players